Carmarthenshire County Council is the local authority for the county of Carmarthenshire, Wales. It provides a range of services including education, planning, transport, social services and public safety. The council is one of twenty-two unitary authorities that came into existence on 1 April 1996 under the provisions of the Local Government (Wales) Act 1994. It took over local government functions previously provided by the three district councils of Carmarthen, Dinefwr, and Llanelli, as well as the county-level services in the area from Dyfed County Council, all of which councils were abolished at the same time.

The council is based at County Hall in Carmarthen.

History
It is the second body of this name; the previous Carmarthenshire County Council was formed on 1 April 1889 by the Local Government Act 1888, taking over the local government functions of the Quarter Sessions. The first election to the original council was held in January 1889 and the majority of the seats were won by the Liberals. This pattern continued until the 1920s from which time most rural seats were held by independents, while the Labour Party dominated the industrial part of the county.

The original Carmarthenshire County Council was abolished under the Local Government Act 1972, with the area becoming part of the county of Dyfed, which also covered the former administrative counties of Pembrokeshire and Cardiganshire. From 1974 until 1996 the area of the former administrative county of Carmarthenshire was split into the three districts of Carmarthen, Dinefwr, and Llanelli, with Dyfed County Council providing county-level services.

Under the Local Government (Wales) Act 1994 these councils established in 1974 were all abolished, and Carmarthenshire County Council was re-established as a unitary authority for the area.

Political control
The first election to the re-established council was held in 1995, initially operating as a shadow authority before coming into its powers on 1 April 1996. Political control of the council since 1996 has been held by the following parties:

Leadership
The leaders of the council since 1996 have been:

The council's chief executive since 2019 has been Wendy Walters. She succeeded Mark James, who had held the post for 17 years.

Current composition 
As of 5 May 2022:

Party with majority control in bold

Elections
Elections take place every five years. The last election was held on 5 May 2022.

Party with the most elected councillors in bold. Coalition agreements in Notes column

 Includes candidates elected as Independent Labour and/or Ratepayers Association.

Electoral divisions
The county is divided into 51 electoral wards returning 75 councillors. In July 2021 Welsh Government accepted a number of ward change proposals by the Local Democracy and Boundary Commission for Wales, the changes gave a better parity of representation. Thirty-four wards remained unchanged. 

Most of these wards are coterminous with communities. Most communities in Carmarthenshire have a community council. For each ward, councillors are elected to sit on Carmarthenshire County Council. The following table lists council wards, community councils and associated geographical areas.  Communities with their own community council are marked with a *.

Arms

References

County councils of Wales
Local government in Carmarthenshire
1996 establishments in Wales